7 Sagittarii is a massive star in the southern zodiac constellation of Sagittarius which is located in the Lagoon Nebula (NGC 6530), although multiple sources have considered it a foreground star. It is a dim star but visible to the naked eye with an apparent visual magnitude of 5.37. It is moving closer to the Sun with a heliocentric radial velocity of −11 km/s.

Gray and Garrison (1989) listed a stellar classification of F2 II/III for this star, suggesting it is a K-type star with a spectrum showing mixed traits of a giant/bright giant. Houk and Smith-Moore (1978) had a similar classification of F2/3 II/III. This may indicate it is not a member of NGC 6530, since it should not have evolved to this class from the O-type stars that still populate this cluster, and hasn't had time to evolve from a less massive cluster star.

It is a suspected chemically peculiar star.  The spectral class from the calcium K line has been given as A8 while the class determined from other metallic lines was F4, making it an Am star.  This peculiarity is now considered doubtful.

7 Sagittarii has an estimated 18 times the Sun's radius and is radiating 658 times the Sun's luminosity from its photosphere at an effective temperature of around 6,800 K.

References

F-type giants
F-type bright giants
Sagittarius (constellation)
Durchmusterung objects
Sagittarii, 07
164584
088380
6724